Dalga is a locality in the Bundaberg Region, Queensland, Australia.

Geography 
The Kolan River rises in the north of locality and flows to the south (Kalpowar). The Dawes Range is in the north-east of the locality and this area is within the Bulburin National Park. Most of the land is mountainous and undeveloped, except for the lower areas in the valley of the Kolan River which are used for grazing.

Education 
There are no schools in Dalga. The nearest primary school is Builyan State School in Many Peaks, while the nearest secondary schools are in Monto and Gin Gin.

References 

Bundaberg Region
Localities in Queensland